Dinorwic is an unincorporated settlement in northwestern Ontario, Canada. It is situated on Highway 17 (the Trans-Canada Highway) at the junction of Highway 72.

The nearest major community is Dryden, where hospital service is provided.

Dinorwic is named after Dinorwic Quarry, a slate quarry in Wales, UK.

External links
Ontario Sunset Country: Tourism profile: Dinorwic
Dryden Community Profile

Communities in Kenora District
Hudson's Bay Company trading posts